Raoul Peeters (born 1 January 1947) is a Belgian footballer and later manager.

References

1947 births
Living people
Belgian footballers
Belgian football managers
K.R.C. Mechelen managers
K. Berchem Sport managers
K.V. Oostende managers
K.S.V. Roeselare managers
Association footballers not categorized by position